Jach is a surname of Polish and Czech origin. Notable people with the surname include: 

Antoni Jach (born 1956), Australian novelist, painter and playwright
Jarosław Jach (born 1994), Polish footballer
Michał Jach (born 1951), Polish politician

References

See also
 

Czech-language surnames
Polish-language surnames
Surnames from given names